Plato's theory of soul, which was inspired by the teachings of Socrates, considered the psyche to be the essence of a person, being that which decides how people behave. Plato considered this essence to be an incorporeal, eternal occupant of a person's being. Plato said that even after death, the soul exists and is able to think. He believed that as bodies die, the soul is continually reborn (metempsychosis) in subsequent bodies. Plato divided the soul into three parts: the logistikon (reason), the thymoeides (spirit), and the epithymetikon (appetite).

The conception of the soul 

Plato was the first person in the history of philosophy to believe that the soul was both the source of life and the mind. In Plato's dialogues, we find the soul playing many disparate roles. Among other things, Plato believes that the soul is what gives life to the body (which was articulated most of all in the Laws and Phaedrus) in terms of self-motion: to be alive is to be capable of moving yourself; the soul is a self-mover. He also thinks that the soul is the bearer of moral properties (i.e., when I am virtuous, it is my soul that is virtuous as opposed to, say, my body). The soul is also the mind: it is that which thinks in us.

We see this casual oscillation between different roles of the soul in many dialogues. First of all, in the Republic:Is there any function of the soul that you could not accomplish with anything else, such as taking care of something (epimeleisthai), ruling, and deliberating, and other such things? Could we correctly assign these things to anything besides the soul, and say that they are characteristic (idia) of it?

No, to nothing else.

What about living? Will we deny that this is a function of the soul?

That absolutely is.The Phaedo most famously caused problems to scholars who were trying to make sense of this aspect of Plato's theory of the soul.

Accordingly, the Phaedo presents a real challenge to commentators through the way that Plato oscillates between different conceptions of the soul.

In the cyclical and Form-of-life arguments, for instance, the soul is presented as something connected with life, where, in particular in the final argument, this connection is spelled out concretely by means of the soul's conceptual connection with life. This connection is further developed in the Phaedrus and Laws where the definition of soul is given as self-motion. Rocks, for instance, do not move unless something else moves them; inanimate, unliving objects are always said to behave this way. In contrast, living things are capable of moving themselves. Plato uses this observation to illustrate his famous doctrine that the soul is a self-mover: life is self-motion, and the soul brings life to a body by moving it.

Meanwhile, in the recollection and affinity arguments, the connection with life is not explicated or used at all. These two arguments present the soul as a knower (i.e., a mind). This is most clear in the affinity argument, where the soul is said to be immortal in virtue of its affinity with the Forms that we observe in acts of cognition.

It is not at all clear how these two roles of the soul are related to each other.  Sarah Broadie famously complained that “readers of the Phaedo sometimes take Plato to task for confusing soul as mind or that which thinks, with soul as that which animates the body." Others included II.M. Crombie and Dorothea Frede.

More-recent scholarship has overturned this accusation, arguing that part of the novelty of Plato's theory of the soul is that it was the first to unite the different features and powers of the soul that became commonplace in later ancient and medieval philosophy. For Plato, the soul moves things by means of its thoughts, as one scholar puts it, and accordingly, the soul is both a mover (i.e., the principle of life, where life is conceived of as self-motion) and a thinker.

The tripartite soul
The Platonic soul consists of three parts which are located in different regions of the body:

 the logos (λογιστικόν), or logistikon, located in the head, is related to reason and regulates the other parts.
 the thymos (θυμοειδές), or thumoeides, located near the chest region, is related to spirit.
 the eros (ἐπιθυμητικόν), or epithumetikon, located in the stomach, is related to one's desires.

In his treatise the Republic, and also with the chariot allegory in Phaedrus, Plato asserted that the three parts of the psyche also correspond to the three classes of a society (viz. the rulers, the military, and the ordinary citizens). The function of the epithymetikon is to produce and seek pleasure. The function of the logistikon is to gently rule through the love of learning. The function of the thymoeides is to obey the directions of the logistikon while ferociously defending the whole from external invasion and internal disorder. 

Whether in a city or an individual, justice (δικαιοσύνη, dikaiosyne) is declared to be the state of the whole in which each part fulfills its function, while temperance is the state of the whole where each part does not attempt to interfere in the functions of the others. Injustice (ἀδικία, adikia) is the contrary state of the whole, often taking the specific form in which the spirited is obedient to the appetitive, while they together either ignore the logical entirely or employ it in their pursuits of pleasure.

In the Republic
In Book IV, part 4, of the Republic, Socrates and his interlocutors (Glaucon and Adeimantus) are attempting to answer whether the soul is one or made of parts. Socrates states: "It is obvious that the same thing will never do or suffer opposites in the same respect in relation to the same thing and at the same time. So that if ever we find these contradictions in the functions of the mind we shall know that it was not the same thing functioning but a plurality." (This is an example of Plato's principle of non-contradiction.) For instance, it seems that, given each person has only one soul, it should be impossible for a person to simultaneously desire something yet also at that very moment be averse to the same thing, as when one is tempted to commit a crime but also averse to it.  Both Socrates and Glaucon agree that it should not be possible for the soul to be at the same time both in one state and its opposite. From this it follows that there must be at least two aspects to soul. Having named these as "reason" and "appetite", Plato goes on to identify a third aspect, "spirit", which in a healthy psyche ought to be aligned with reason.

Reason (λογιστικόν)

The logical or logistikon (from logos) is the thinking part of the soul which loves the truth and seeks to learn it. Plato originally identifies the soul dominated by this part with the Athenian temperament.

Plato makes the point that the logistikon would be the smallest part of the soul (as the rulers would be the smallest population within the Republic), but that, nevertheless, a soul can be declared just only if all three parts agree that the logistikon should rule.

Spirit (θυμοειδές)
According to Plato, the spirited or thymoeides (from thymos) is the part of the soul by which we are angry or get into a temper. He also calls this part 'high spirit' and initially identifies the soul dominated by this part with the Thracians, Scythians and the people of "northern regions".

Appetite (ἐπιθυμητικόν)
The appetite or epithymetikon (from epithymia, translated to Latin as concupiscentia or desiderium).

Reincarnation
Plato's theory of the reincarnation of the soul combined the ideas of Socrates and Pythagoras, mixing the divine privileges of men with the path of reincarnations between different animal species. He believed the human prize for the virtuous or the punishment for the guilty were not placed in different parts of the underworld, but directly on Earth. After death, a guilty soul would be re-embodied first in a woman (in accordance with Plato's belief that women occupied a lower level of the natural scale), and then in an animal species, descending from quadrupeds down to snakes and fish. According to this theory, women and the lower animals were created only in order to provide a habitation for degraded souls.

Plato most of the time says that there is a distinct reward-and-punishment phase of the afterlife between reincarnations. Only in the Timaeus and Laws does the reward-and-punishment phase disappear; in these two texts, the punishment is said to be the reincarnation itself. Recent scholars have argued that the theory of reincarnation is intended to be literally true. In the Timaeus, for instance, it appears as a scientific theory to explain the generation of non-human animals; elsewhere, it appears as the conclusion of other philosophical commitments that Plato argues for, such as that virtue is always rewarded and vice punished, and that the only way to punish a soul is to embody it.

See also
 Tripartite (theology)
 Sigmund Freud's concepts of the id, ego and superego

References

External links

"Plato: Moral Psychology". Internet Encyclopedia of Philosophy.

Platonism
Theory of mind
Ancient Greek metaphysics